Myron Mitchell (born June 17, 1998) is an American football wide receiver for the Birmingham Stallions of the United States Football League (USFL). He played college football at UAB and was signed by the Minnesota Vikings as an undrafted free agent in 2021.

Early life and education
Mitchell was born on June 17, 1998, in Jasper, Alabama. He attended Walker High School there, compiling 67 catches for 1,090 yards and 11 touchdowns as a senior. After graduating, Mitchell accepted a scholarship offer from Butler Community College. He played with Butler from 2016 to 2017, his freshman and sophomore seasons, appearing in 19 games. He totaled 17 catches for 287 yards and one touchdown during his freshman season, and 25 receptions for 233 yards and one touchdown as a sophomore.

Mitchell transferred to University of Alabama at Birmingham in 2018, spending his junior year as a redshirt. As a redshirt-junior in 2019, he appeared in all 14 games and compiled 34 catches for 554 yards and four touchdowns. He also scored a kick return touchdown in the season opener against Alabama State. At the end of the season, he was named honorable mention all-conference at both the wide receiver and kick returner positions. Mitchell made 29 catches for 436 yards and three touchdowns as a senior and was named honorable mention all-conference for the second year.

Professional career

Minnesota Vikings
After going unselected in the 2021 NFL Draft, Mitchell was signed by the Minnesota Vikings as an undrafted free agent. He was released on August 31 but re-signed to the practice squad the next day. He was activated from the practice squad on December 20. He made his NFL debut in week 15 versus the Chicago Bears, appearing on one offensive snap in the 17–9 win. He signed a reserve/future contract with the Vikings on January 10, 2022.

On August 29, 2022, Mitchell was released by the Vikings.

Birmingham Stallions
Mitchell signed with the Michigan Panthers of the USFL on December 13, 2022, but had his playing rights traded to the Birmingham Stallions three days later.

References

1998 births
Living people
Players of American football from Alabama
American football wide receivers
Butler Grizzlies football players
UAB Blazers football players
Minnesota Vikings players
Michigan Panthers (2022) players
Birmingham Stallions (2022) players